Cheer Gone is the fourth solo album by Euros Childs, released on 27 October 2008 for Wichita Recordings.

Track listing 

All tracks written by Euros Childs.

 "Autumn Leaves"
 "Summer Days"
 "Her Ways"
 "Nineteen Fifties"
 "My Love is Gone"
 "Always Thinking Of Her"
 "Farm-hand Murder"
 "Saving Up To Get Married"
 "O Ein Daear"
 "Medicine Head"
 "Sing Song Song"

References 

2008 albums
Euros Childs albums
Wichita Recordings albums